Vladimir, baptismal name: Vasily Nikiforovich Bogoyavlensky (1 January 1848 – ), was a bishop of the Russian Orthodox Church. He was appointed the position of Metropolitan of Moscow and Kolomna between 1898–1912, Metropolitan of St. Petersburg and Ladoga between 1912–1915, and Metropolitan of Kiev and Gallich between 1915–1918. Murdered by Bolshevik soldiers in 1918, Metropolitan Vladimir was glorified as a Hieromartyr by the Russian Orthodox Church in 1998.

He was Primus (chairman) of the Holy Synod (1912-1917).

Priesthood 
Born to a family of a clergyman in Tambov Governorate, Vasili Bogoyavlensky graduated from a seminary in Tambov and Kiev Theological Academy. He then returned to Tambov to teach at his alma mater. In 1882, Vasili was ordained a priest in a town of Kozlov in Tambov Guberniya. On the death of his wife and child in 1886, he was tonsured (took monastic vows) being given the religious name of Vladimir, and was appointed igumen (abbot) of the Trinity Monastery in that same town.

Bishop of Samara and Stavropolsk 
In 1888, Igumen Vladimir was sent to St Petersburg as a vicar to assist the Metropolitan and was thereafter consecrated as a bishop. He was soon assigned to preach in Samara. When the country was afflicted by the epidemic of cholera and crop failure, he called upon the clergy and laity to help the needy and often conducted moliebens himself, beseeching the Lord to deliver people from calamities.

For six years, from 1892, Vladimir administered the Georgian Exarchate, paying special attention to the spiritual enlightenment of the multiethnic Orthodox population of the Caucasus, and opening new churches and parish schools.

Metropolitan of Moscow and Kolomna 
In 1898, Bishop Vladimir was summoned to Moscow where he was appointed Metropolitan of Moscow. During the events of October 1905, Metropolitan Vladimir wrote an address entitled, "What should we do during these troubled days?" (Что нам делать в эти тревожные наши дни?) and ordered that it be read aloud to the people in all of the churches in and around Moscow. In this address, he told the people of Moscow about the "criminal" and "anti-Christian" intentions of those who had compiled The Protocols of the Elders of Zion. Metropolitan Vladimir's address made a huge impression on those who confessed Russian Orthodoxy. He himself read his speech in the Assumption Cathedral of the Moscow Kremlin. Assessing the Protocols, Vladimir directly associated its authors' "monstrous" intentions with the revolutionary events in Russia, examining the then-ongoing social disturbance in the Russian society from a religious, not political, point of view. He urged the Eastern Orthodox people to stand up against the Anti-Christ.

Metropolitan of St. Petersburg and Ladoga 
Upon the death of the Metropolitan Anthony of Saint Petersburg in 1912, Metropolitan Vladimir was chosen to fill this post. His successful career in this city, however, came to an end because he had been criticizing Grigori Rasputin's influence on the Church.

Metropolitan of Kiev and Galich 
In December 1915, Vladimir was sent away to Kiev. He was Metropolitan of Kiev and Gallich from 1915 to 1918. A few months after the October Revolution, Metropolitan Vladimir was arrested by five Red Army soldiers on  when the army of Muravyov swept through Ukraine and in front of his monks was immediately executed and his body mutilated.

Metropolitan Vladimir was glorified (canonized) as a saint by the Russian Orthodox Church on October 4, 1998. His feast day is celebrated on January 25, the date of his martyrdom. The Russian Orthodox Church follows the traditional Julian Calendar in determining feast day; currently, January 25 falls on February 7 of the modern Gregorian Calendar. He was the first bishop to suffer as a New Martyr under the Soviets.

See also
List of unsolved murders

References

External links 
 St Vladimir, Metropolitan of Kiev and Gallich Orthodox icon and synaxarion
 ВЛАДИМИР (Богоявленский), священномученик, митрополит Киевский и Галицкий

1848 births
1918 deaths
People from Morshansky District
People from Morshansky Uyezd
Vladimir
Russian Orthodox bishops of Kyiv
Eastern Orthodox missionaries
Most Holy Synod
Russian monarchists
Kiev Theological Academy alumni
Russian saints
20th-century Christian saints
Eastern Orthodox people executed by the Soviet Union
Male murder victims
Unsolved murders in Ukraine
Burials at the Far Caves, Kyiv Pechersk Lavra